Otoba acuminata is a species of plant in the family Myristicaceae found in Costa Rica, Ecuador, and Panama. It is threatened by habitat loss.

References

Myristicaceae
Flora of Costa Rica
Flora of Ecuador
Flora of Panama
Taxonomy articles created by Polbot